The 1995 Sparkassen Cup, also known by its fll name Sparkassen Cup International Damen Grand Prix Leipzig, was a women's tennis tournament played on indoor carpet courts in Leipzig in Germany that was part of the Tier II category of the 1995 WTA Tour. It was the sixth edition of the tournament and was held from 25 September through 1 October 1995. Fourth-seeded Anke Huber won the singles title and earned $79,000 first-prize money.

Finals

Singles
 Anke Huber defeated  Magdalena Maleeva walkover
 It was Huber's 1st singles title of the year and the 7th of her career.

Doubles
 Larisa Savchenko /  Meredith McGrath defeated  Brenda Schultz-McCarthy /  Caroline Vis 6–4, 6–4
 It was Savchenko's 5th doubles title of the year and the 52nd of her career. It was McGrath's 5th doubles title of the year and the 21st of her career.

References

External links
 ITF tournament edition details
 Tournament draws

Sparkassen Cup
Sparkassen Cup (tennis)
1995 in German tennis